Bill Bonko is a Canadian politician and former member of the Legislative Assembly of Alberta. He was first elected in the 2004 election as a Liberal in Edmonton Decore, but was defeated in his 2008 re-election bid by Progressive Conservative Janice Sarich.

Early life

Bill Bonko graduated from Queen Elizabeth High School.  He worked for fifteen years as the circulation manager for the Edmonton Journal.

Political career

Bonko first sought political office in the 1995 municipal election, when he was elected to the Board of Edmonton Public Schools as trustee for Ward A.  He was re-elected in the 1998 and 2001 elections.  He did not seek re-election at the conclusion of his third term.  Instead, he ran for the Legislative Assembly of Alberta in Edmonton Decore in the 2004 provincial election as a Liberal. He won 44.63% of the vote and defeated his opponents, who included former MLA Walter Szwender who was running for the Progressive Conservatives and Gary Masyk, an incumbent MLA whose riding had been abolished and who had crossed the floor to become the Alberta Alliance's first MLA after being elected as PC.  He did not sponsor any bills during his time in the legislature, and was defeated by Progressive Conservative candidate Janice Sarich in the 2008 election.

Personal life

Bonko is married to Michele; the pair has two children, including Bill Jr. who ran as a Liberal candidate in Athabasca-Redwater in the 2008 provincial election.

Election results

References

Alberta Liberal Party MLAs
Living people
Politicians from Edmonton
Year of birth missing (living people)
21st-century Canadian politicians